State Road 403 (SR 403), now known as County Road 403, is a six-mile (10 km) northeast-to-southwest route that lies entirely within Clark County.

Route description
County Road 403 begins in the north end of Sellersburg at U.S. Route 31, just south of the community of Speed.  The road runs northeast in a straight line toward central Charlestown where it intersects with State Road 160 at that road's eastern terminus.  The road terminates at State Road 3 about 300 feet further to the northeast.

History
In September 2012, the entire length of SR 403 was decommissioned as a State Highway and taken over by Clark County.

Major intersections

References

External links

403
Transportation in Clark County, Indiana
Charlestown, Indiana